Ángel Rodríguez Campillo (born 20 May 1985 in Elche, Province of Alicante, Spain) is a professional Grand Prix motorcycle road racer. He currently competes in the RFME Superstock 1000 Championship, aboard a Kawasaki ZX-10R.

Rodríguez started racing in pocketbikes. He competed in the Spanish Championship, where he won the title in 2001 again riders like Casey Stoner, Jorge Lorenzo, Chaz Davies, Marco Simoncelli. He also made his debut in the 125cc World Championship in 2000. In 2001 he rode for Aspar Team with his CEV Aprilia bike. In 2001 he done some good race including a sixth place in Jerez and a great race in Phillip Island. In this race he fight for the victory until last lap, but a rider crashed in front of him while Angel was third and he crashed.
 
In 2002 he continued with Aspar Team and he improved his qualification results starting some races in second row, but he had some crashes and some mechanical failures and he did not finish many races. After these bad results, Angel and the Aspar team decided to finish the contract, but they were together again in the last round of the 250cc class in Valencia.

In 2004 he rode for Derbi being Jorge Lorenzo teammate, but Angel did not have good results. He was in the same team as Jorge Lorenzo but with a very different bike - older and with many mechanical problems in free practice, qualys and races, this is why Angel not finish many races in the 2004 season.

In 2005 and 2006 he improved his results in the category doing the fastest lap of the race in Australia 2005 with Team Toth bike, this was incredible because before Angel arrived to this team they did not get any points that season.

In 2007 he went to CEV, doing a great season in his first season in a 600cc bike. He finished third due to an injury.

In 2008, Rodríguez became the 600cc Spanish National Champion winning all races and doing all poles of the championship and he became European Champion, too, winning this championship against some riders who rode in World SSP. He also made three World Supersport appearances with his CEV bike doing 2 top 10 in 3 races. After this amazing season, some World SSP and World SBK were interested in signing him and also Aspar Team had some conversations with Angel for race in 2009 MotoGP season, but due to sponsors problems he did not sign with any of this teams.

In 2009 he won the three races and he did the three poles in Spanish championship, but after that he stopped racing due to problems with RFME and for not having support of sponsors to be back at the world championship.

In 2012 he was back in World Moto2 but after the first races he decided to finish the contract with his team because they did not have the equipment for fighting for the top 5.

After that Angel went to FIM CEV and rode with the old Suzuki, with amazing results including one pole and one victory and earning the track record in Alcarras Circuit.

In 2016 and 2017 he has finished third in CEV having good results in the category with many podiums and being one of references of the category.

Career statistics

Grand Prix motorcycle racing

By season

Races by year
(key) (Races in bold indicate pole position, races in italics indicate fastest lap)

Supersport World Championship

Races by year
(key) (Races in bold indicate pole position, races in italics indicate fastest lap)

References

External links 

  

1985 births
Living people
Sportspeople from Elche
Spanish motorcycle racers
125cc World Championship riders
250cc World Championship riders
Supersport World Championship riders
Moto2 World Championship riders
Doping cases in motorcycle racing